= Mohammad Ali Kaidi =

Emirati association football player (born 1999)

Mohammad Ali Kaidi محمد علي كيدي
Personal information
- Full name: Mohammad Ali Kaidi Ibrahim Rahma
- Date of birth: 23 September 1999 (age 27)
- Place of birth: Emirates
- Height: 1.80 m (5 ft 11 in)
- Position: Midfielder

Youth career
- –2019: Al-Wasl

Senior career*
Years	Team	Apps	(Gls)
2019–2022	Al-Wasl	1	(0)
- * Club domestic league appearances and goals

Mohammad Ali Kaidi (Arabic:محمد علي كيدي) (born 23 September 1999) is an Emirati footballer who plays as a midfielder.

== Career ==
Kaidi started his career at Al-Wasl and is a product of the Al-Wasl's youth system. On 26 May 2019, Kaidi made his professional debut for Al-Wasl against Ittihad Kalba in the Pro League .
